Ramallo is a town in Buenos Aires Province, Argentina. It is the administrative centre for Ramallo Partido. It is located on the Río Paraná.

Economy
The city has an important port on the Paraná River. The main products of the region are agricultural goods, cattle feed and industrial crops. They include potato, citrus, soy, grains and vegetables. There is also a large stock breeding, pigs, sheep and horses community.

People from Ramallo
Mateo Coronel, footballer

Gallery

References

External links

 Municipal website

Populated places in Buenos Aires Province
Populated places established in 1864